George Sulima (February 27, 1928 – October 31, 1987) was an American football end. He played for the Pittsburgh Steelers from 1952 to 1954.

References

1928 births
1987 deaths
American football ends
American football defensive ends
Boston University Terriers football players
Pittsburgh Steelers players
Players of American football from Connecticut
Sportspeople from New Britain, Connecticut